Jake Lloyd (born 1989) is an American actor.

Jake Lloyd may also refer to:

Jake Lloyd (footballer) (born 1993), Australian rules footballer
Jake Lloyd-Jones, Australian television producer